Oscar Bossaert (5 November 1887 – 1 February 1956) was a Belgian footballer. He played in twelve matches for the Belgium national football team from 1911 to 1913.

References

External links
 

1887 births
1956 deaths
Belgian footballers
Belgium international footballers
Association football defenders
Footballers from Brussels